Current Contents is a rapid alerting service database from Clarivate Analytics, formerly the Institute for Scientific Information and Thomson Reuters. It is published online and in several different printed subject sections.

History
Current Contents was first published in paper format, in a single edition devoted only to biology and medicine. Other subject editions were added later. Initially, it consisted simply of a reproduction of the title pages from several hundred major peer-reviewed scientific journals, and was published weekly, with the issues containing title pages from journal issues only a few weeks previously, a shorter time lag than any service then available. There was an author index and a crude keyword subject index only. Author addresses were provided so readers could send reprint requests for copies of the actual articles.

Status
Still published in print, it is available as one of the databases included in Clarivate Analytics' ISI Web of Knowledge with daily updates, and also through other database aggregators.

Editions
The Current Contents published editions are as follows.

Current Contents Agricultural, Biological, and Environmental Sciences
Current Contents Arts and Humanities
Current Contents Clinical Practice
Current Contents Engineering, Technology, and Applied  Sciences
Current Contents Life Sciences
Current Contents Physical Chemical and Earth Sciences
Current Contents Social & Behavioral Sciences

Current Contents Collections

Current Contents Collections is issued as two different editions. These are the Electronics and Telecommunications Collection and the Business Collection. These collections index scholarly journals, trade publications, as well as business and industry related publications.  

The Business Collection indexes about 240 journals and trade publications relevant to business administration and management theory and practice. Coverage includes the general subject areas of Business, Economics, Employee Relations, Human Resources, Management, Organization, Marketing, and Business Communication. 

The Electronics and Telecommunications Collection indexes about 210 journals and trade publications relevant to research and developed technology   that pertains to the electronics industry. Coverage includes the general subject areas of Electronics, Electrical Engineering, Optics, Laser Research, Laser Technology, Semiconductors, Solid State Materials Technology, and Telecommunications Technology.

See also 
 Google Scholar
 List of academic databases and search engines
 Lists of academic journals
 List of open-access journals
 List of scientific journals

References

C.D. Hunt, Information Sources in Science and Technology, 3rd ed. Libraries Unlimited, 1998

External links
Current Contents Connect

Bibliographic databases and indexes
Clarivate
Online databases